On 25 February 2022, the Russian air base in Millerovo, Rostov Oblast, Russia was attacked by Ukrainian forces during the 2022 Russian invasion of Ukraine. According to some Ukrainian officials, Ukrainian military forces attacked the Millerovo air base with OTR-21 Tochka missiles, destroying Russian Air Force planes and setting the airbase on fire.

Background 
Millerovo is a town in Rostov Oblast in Russia, about 60 kilometers from Luhansk, a territory in the Donbas region bordering Russia and partially Russian-rebel held since the beginning of the Russo-Ukrainian War.

Attack 
A local law enforcement agency source told local outlet Komsomolskaya Pravda that a Ukrainian Tochka-U missile had hit the facility. Another local outlet, Rostov Gazeta reported that the attack was carried out by Ukrainian armed formations.

Analysis
Editor-in-chief edition of Ukrainian largest online media Censor.net Yuriy Butusov called the attack "One of the most successful Armed Forces of Ukraine operations in the history of war" and "defeat, which Putin will not be able to hide".

The attack, which the Ukrainian Armed Forces did not officially comment on, was reportedly launched in response to the shelling of Ukrainian cities by Russian forces.

Aftermath 
Multiple people were reported to be wounded, and one pilot reportedly died later of his wounds. At least one Sukhoi Su-30SM was destroyed on the ground per tweeted images. However, Ukrainian officials and military experts have claimed that at least two Russian Su-30SM fighters were destroyed on the ground.

See also 
 Great Raid of 2014

References 

Battles of the 2022 Russian invasion of Ukraine
February 2022 events in Russia
Airstrikes conducted by Ukraine
History of Rostov Oblast